Pseudomonal pyoderma is a cutaneous condition, a superficial infection of the skin with P. aeruginosa. The skin can have a 'mousy' odor.  It presents typically on the feet with macerated 'moth-eaten' appearance, green-blue purulence, and eroded borders.

See also 
 Blastomycosis-like pyoderma
 List of cutaneous conditions

References 

Bacterium-related cutaneous conditions